Khalick Antonio Caldwell (born January 1, 1996), better known as Stunna 4 Vegas (formerly stylized as $tunna 4 Vegas), is an American rapper. He is currently signed to DaBaby's label Billion Dollar Baby Entertainment. His most popular singles are "Animal" (featuring DaBaby) and "Up the Smoke" (featuring Offset).

Other hit singles include "Ashley" (featuring DaBaby), "Tomorrow" (featuring Moneybagg Yo), and "Do Dat" (featuring DaBaby and Lil Baby). His debut album, BIG 4X, was released in 2019. It peaked at number 50 on the Billboard 200. His second studio album, Rich Youngin, was released in 2020. It debuted at number 29 on the Billboard 200.

He is cousins with Philadelphia Eagles defensive tackle Javon Hargrave.

Career

2018: "Animal" and signing to DaBaby
In late September 2018, Caldwell released the track "Animal", which featured fellow North Carolina rapper DaBaby. The track gained popularity after it was posted on DaBaby's channel. Caldwell signed to DaBaby's record label Billion Dollar Baby Entertainment, and was featured on his track "4X" produced by Producer 20 (Igot20onmybeat) from his November 2018 mixtape Blank Blank.

2019: Further success and debut album
Caldwell was featured on DaBaby's track "Joggers" from his debut album Baby on Baby in March 2019. He was then featured on Asian Da Brat's 2019 mixtape Unfuccwitable, on the track "I Love It".
  
In May 2019, Caldwell signed with Interscope Records. He then released his debut album under the label, BIG 4X, on May 10, 2019. The album contained guest features from DaBaby, Offset, NLE Choppa, Young Nudy, & Lil Durk. The album peaked at number 50 on the Billboard 200, and received positive reviews.

In the following months, he released singles such as "Tomorrow" featuring Moneybagg Yo, "Flintstones" featuring BannUpPrince, "Boat 4 Vegas" featuring Lil Yachty, "Up The Smoke" with Offset, and "Long." He revealed the album's title during an interview with music website Groovy Tracks. In September 2019, he was featured on the track "Really" from DaBaby's second studio album Kirk. The song debuted and peaked at number 63 on the Billboard Hot 100, making it Caldwell's first entry on the Hot 100.

2020: Rich Youngin
On January 17, 2020, Caldwell released his second studio album, Rich Youngin. It included features from DaBaby, Lil Baby, Blac Youngsta, and Offset. It peaked at number 29 on the Billboard 200. The album received lukewarm reviews from critics.

In February 2020, Caldwell earned his first Billboard-charting single as a lead artist and his second charting single overall, with "Go Stupid" debuting and peaking at number 60 on the Billboard Hot 100.
On July 27, 2020, Stunna 4 Vegas released a collaboration with DaBaby titled "No Dribble". Later on, in November 2020, Caldwell released his third studio album, Welcome to 4 Vegas, which included features from DaBaby, Murda Beatz, Toosii, and Ola Runt and did not chart.

Discography

Studio Albums

Mixtapes

Extended plays

Singles

As lead artist

As featured artist

Other charted songs

Guest appearances

Notes

References

External links 

1996 births
21st-century American rappers
African-American male rappers
Gangsta rappers
Interscope Records artists
Living people
People from Salisbury, North Carolina
Rappers from North Carolina
21st-century African-American musicians